MFM may refer to:

Broadcasting
 MFM 92.6, a South African radio station based at Stellenbosch University  
 MFM 97.1, former name of Heart Wirral, a local radio station in Birkenhead, UK
 MFM 103.4, former name of Marcher Sound, a UK radio station
 MFM Radio, a French radio station

Computers
 Mobile file management, software to manage data on mobile devices
 Modified frequency modulation, a data encoding method used on floppy disks and older hard disks

Other
 MFM, IATA airport code for Macau International Airport
 Magnetic force microscope, an atomic force microscope for examining samples of magnetic materials
 Marine fuel management, techniques for efficient use of fuel by ships
 Material flow management, a method of efficiently managing materials
 Maternal-fetal medicine, the subspeciality of obstetrics that deals with high risk pregnancies.
 Melodies from Mars, an unreleased album by Richard David James under his pseudonym Afx
 Methylsulfonylmethane, an organosulfur chemical sometimes used as a dietary supplement
 Mountain of Fire and Miracles, an evangelical church in Nigeria
 Mpitolona ho an'ny Fandrosoan'i Madagasikara (Movement for the Progress of Madagascar), a Madagascar political party
 Multifunctional monitor, a flat panel display with inputs for a variety of external video sources
 Multilevel flow modelling, a framework for modeling industrial processes